Lincoln High School is a public junior and senior high school in Ellwood City, Pennsylvania. It is the only high school in the Ellwood City Area School District. It enrolls some 1,079 students. School colors are blue and white.

Notable alumni
 Bob Babcock - Major League Baseball player
 Buzz Guy - Professional football player
 Donnie Iris - Rock musician
 Stephen Johns - Professional ice hockey player
 Leslie H. Sabo, Jr. - Medal of Honor awardee
 Debra McCloskey Todd -PA State Supreme Court Justice

References

Official website

Public high schools in Pennsylvania
Schools in Beaver County, Pennsylvania
Public middle schools in Pennsylvania